Verkhnesaitovo (Ürge Säyet) is a rural locality (a village) in Bakayevsky Selsoviet, Kushnarenkovsky District, Bashkortostan, Russia. The population was 242 as of 2010. There are 2 streets.

Geography 
Verkhnesaitovo is located 31 km southwest of Kushnarenkovo (the district's administrative centre) by road. Nizhnesaitovo is the nearest rural locality.

References 

Rural localities in Kushnarenkovsky District